Calafiore is a surname. Notable people with the surname include:

Aydan Calafiore (born 2000), Australian singer
Cody Calafiore (born 1990), American real estate agent, actor, and model
Jim Calafiore, American comic book drawer
Lorenzo Calafiore (1935–2011), Italian wrestler

Italian-language surnames